Unguarded Women is a 1924 American silent drama film directed by Alan Crosland and starring Bebe Daniels. It was produced by Famous Players-Lasky and released by Paramount Pictures.

Plot
The film is about a man who, rather than be with the woman he loves, marries one whose situation he feels responsible for.

Cast

Production
The plot was adapted from a Saturday Evening Post story titled "Face", written by Lucy Stone Terrill.

Preservation
With no copies of Unguarded Women located in any film archives, it is a lost film.

References

External links

1924 films
American silent feature films
Films based on short fiction
Lost American films
Films directed by Alan Crosland
Paramount Pictures films
1924 drama films
Silent American drama films
American black-and-white films
1924 lost films
Lost drama films
1920s American films
1920s English-language films